The Three Lakes Railway (German: Dreiseenbahn, or sometimes, Drei-Seen-Bahn.) is a  long line in the German state of Baden-Württemberg. The line is electrified to the standard 15 kV, 16⅔ Hz system commonly used throughout the German railway network.

The Dreiseenbahn branches southwards from the Höllentalbahn railway, from Freiburg im Breisgau to Donaueschingen, at Titisee station. Along its route it serves stations and halts at Feldberg-Bärental, Altglashütten-Falkau, Aha and Schluchsee, before terminating at Seebrugg.

The line is so called because it passes by the three lakes of Titisee, Windgfällweiher and Schluchsee.

On certain dates throughout the year historic steam trains are operated between Seebrugg, Titisee and Löffingen (Höllentalbahn) by IG 3-Seenbahn, an association of railway enthusiasts located in Seebrugg.

References

Gallery

External links

Railway lines in Baden-Württemberg
Railway lines in the Black Forest